The Sargasso Sea is a region of the North Atlantic Ocean.

Sargasso Sea or Sargasso may also refer to:

 Sargasso Sea (John Abercrombie and Ralph Towner album), 1976
 Sargasso Sea (Pram album), 1995
 Sargasso, a 1977 novel by Edwin Corley
 "Sargasso Sea", a song in the Scale the Summit discography
 "Sargasso Sea", a song by Salt Tank

See also
 
 Wide Sargasso Sea (disambiguation)
 Saragossa (disambiguation)